Kārlis Balodis (June 20, 1864 – January 13, 1931) was a notable Latvian economist, financist, statistician and demographist. Most notably, he is the author of civilian rationing, which was first used in Germany during the First World War. Balodis has received the Grand Gold Medal of the Russian Academy of Sciences, as well as Dmitry Tolstoy Prize.

Biography 
He was the youngest among three children, his grandfather was a preacher at the Vidzeme's church. Carl lost his father and mother early. The family moved to Riga, where  lived in very cramped conditions.

He was self-taught and in 1883, as external candidate he graduated from gymnasium in Jelgava.

He studied theology in Dorpat (1884-1887), in 1888 he was ordained a Lutheran pastor and went to Brazil, where in 1889-1891 he unsuccessfully tried to establish a Latvian colony. In 1891-1892, he studied geography at the University of Jena in Germany and defended his doctoral thesis. In 1893-1895, he served as Lutheran pastor in the Urals and wrote studies on demography and statistics. In 1895, he moved to Germany again, studied economics at the universities of Munich and Strasbourg.

He became known as the demographer after the publication of the book "Mortality, age composition and longevity of the Russian Orthodox population of both sexes in 1851-1890."

Career 
Between 1884 and 1887 Kārlis studied theology at the University of Tartu. In 1888, he was sent to Brazil to work as a Lutheran minister. In 1891 and 1892, he studied geography at the University of Jena. Between 1893 and 1895, he worked as a minister in the Ural Mountains region, and wrote his first researches on demography and statistics. In 1895, he started studying economics at the University of Munich.

After 1899, Balodis worked as an associate professor at the University of Berlin. In 1905, he became an employee of Prussian Statistics Office, and in 1908, he started work at the German Federal Ministry of Finance. In 1918 he became the first chairman of the Pro Palestinian Committee. In 1919, he worked on the civilian rationing system.

After the war Balodis returned to Latvia, where he became a professor at the University of Latvia. In 1928, he was elected to the 3rd Saeima, representing the Labour League of Latvia. He died on 13 January 1931, during the session of the 3rd Saeima, and his seat was filled by Pēteris Zālīte.

Ballod-Atlanticus and Der Zukunftsstaat
Balodis was also known as Ballod-Atlanticus after he adopted the name Atlanticus from Francis Bacon's book Nova Atlantis (1627). Under this name he published the utopian book Ein Blick in Der Zukunftsstaat: Produktion und Konsum im Sozialstaat  (A Look at the Future State: Production and Consumption in the Socialist State). The first edition, which ran to 3,000 copies, was published in 1898 with a preface by Karl Kautsky. A second edition which ran to 12,000 copies was issued in 1919, with a third edition of 5,000 appearing in 1920 and a final edition appearing in 1927 with the slightly different title of  1927 as Der Zukunftsstaat: Wirtschaftstechnisches Ideal und Volkswirtschaftliche Wirklichkeit (The Future State: Economic Ideal and Economic Reality). Several Russian editions were produced between 1903-6, one of which was authorised by Balodis. The second edition was also published in Russia but without the author's permission.

Published works
Balodis primarily wrote in German.
 Der Staat Santa Catharina in Südbrasilien. Stuttgart, 1892
 Die mittlere Lebensdauer in Stadt und Land. Leipzig, 1899
 Ein Blick in  Der Zukunftsstaat. Produktion und Konsum im Sozialstaat. Stuttgart, 1898 (Verlag J.H.W.Dietz Nachf., Berlin 1919)
 Die Sterblichkeit der Grosstädte, 1903
 Sterblichkeit und Lebensdauer in Preussen. Berlin, 1907
 Grundriss der Statistik enthaltend Bevölkerungs-, Wirtschafts-, Finanz- und Handels-Statistik. Berlin, 1913
 Die Bevölkerungsbewegung der letzten Jahrzehnte in Preussen und in einigen anderen wichtigen Staaten Europas. Berlin, 1914
 Palästina als jüdisches Ansiedlungsgebiet. Deutsches Komitee zur Förderung der jüdischen Palästinasiedlung 1918
 Sowjet-Rußland. Verlagsgenossenschaft Freiheit, Berlin 1920
 Der Bankrott der freien Wirtschaft und die notwendigen Finanz- und Wirtschaftsreformen. Jena, 1923

References

External links 
100 Latvijas personības: Nezināmais Balodis 

1864 births
1931 deaths
People from Koknese Municipality
People from Kreis Riga
Latvian Lutheran clergy
Labour League of Latvia politicians 
Deputies of the 3rd Saeima
Latvian scientists
Academic staff of the University of Latvia